Augustus Theodore Wirgman,  DD (- 18 October 1917) was an Anglican priest in the second half of the 19th century and the early part of the 20th, most notably Archdeacon of Port Elizabeth from 1907 until his death.

Augustus was  born in Bradbourne, son of Augustus Wirgman Russell and Jane Elizabeth Pearson. He is cousin of the famous English painter Theodore Blake Wirgman and the prominent cartoonist Charles Wirgman. He was educated at Rossall School; Magdalene College, Cambridge;<ref>Alumni Cantabrigienses: A Biographical List of All Known Students, Graduates and Holders of Office at the University of Cambridge, from the Earliest Times to 1900, John Venn/John Archibald Venn Cambridge University Press > (10 volumes 1922 to 1953) Part II. 1752–1900 Vol. vi. Square – Zupitza, (1954) p544]</ref> and the University of the Cape. 

He was ordained deacon in 1870, and priest in 1871. After curacies in Hartington, Alton and Handsworth he went out to South Africa in 1873. 

He was for many years the incumbent at St Mary, Port Elizabeth.

He was the author of The Blessed Virgin and All the Company of Heaven (Oxford: A. R. Mowbray & Co. Ltd, 1905; London: Cope & Fenwick, 1905; Milwaukee: The Young Churchman, 1913) and [https://books.google.com/books?id=-qAztAEACAAJ Storm and Sunshine in South Africa: With Some Personal and Historical Reminiscences''

References

1846 births
1917 deaths
People from Derbyshire Dales (district)
People educated at Rossall School
Archdeacons of Port Elizabeth
Alumni of Magdalene College, Cambridge
19th-century South African Anglican priests
20th-century South African Anglican priests
University of South Africa alumni